William Thomas Martin Lauder (February 26, 1907 — September 6, 1959) was a Canadian professional ice hockey player who played three games in the National Hockey League for the Boston Bruins during the 1927–28 season. The rest of his career, which lasted from 1927 to 1933, was spent in different minor leagues. He was born in Durham, Ontario.

Career statistics

Regular season and playoffs

External links
 

1907 births
1959 deaths
Boston Bruins players
Buffalo Bisons (IHL) players
Canadian ice hockey defencemen
Hamilton Tigers (CPHL) players
Hamilton Tigers (IHL) players
Ice hockey people from Ontario
Owen Sound Greys players
People from Grey County
Providence Reds players
Syracuse Stars (IHL) players